The Major Public Appointments Select Committee (Malay: Jawatankuasa Pilihan Khas Untuk Melantik Jawatan-Jawatan Utama Perkhidmatan Awam; ; Tamil: மலேசியா பொது சேவை தேர்வுக் குழுவை நியமிக்கிறது) is one of many select committees of the Malaysian House of Representatives, which scrutinises appointments of personnel to government-linked agencies (GLCs), government institutions and the civil service. It is among six new bipartisan parliamentary select committees announced by Speaker of the House of Representatives, Mohamad Ariff Md Yusof, on 4 December 2018 in an effort to improve the institutional system.

Membership

14th Parliament
As of December 2019, the Committee's current members are as follows:

Former members of the committee are as follows:

Chair of the Major Public Appointments Select Committee

See also
Parliamentary Committees of Malaysia

References

Parliament of Malaysia
Committees of the Parliament of Malaysia
Committees of the Dewan Rakyat